George Olivier may refer to:

 George Borg Olivier (1911–1980), Maltese statesman and politician
 George Olivier, count of Wallis (1671–1743), field marshal of Irish descent